Hypothecla honos is a butterfly in the family Lycaenidae. It is found on Sulawesi and Banggai.

References

, 1986. Butterflies of the Oriental Region, Part III Lycaenidae & Riodinidae: pp. 536–672. Melbourne.
, 1912. Ubersicht der Lycaeniden des Indo-Australischen Gebiets. Begründet auf die Ausbeute und die Sammlung des Authors. Berl. ent. Z. 56(3/4): 197-272, 4 Figs.
, 1898. On new and little-known butterflies from the Indo-Malayan, Austro-Malayan and Australian Regions. J. Bombay nat. Hist. Soc. 12: 131-160, 4 pls.
, 1878. In Piepers & Snellen, 1878, Opgave van en Aanteekeningen over Lepidoptera in Zud-West Celebes Verzameld. Tijdschr. Ent. 21:1-43, 1 pl.
, 2003. The Butterflies of Sulawesi, NMNH, Leiden.

Butterflies described in 1898
Theclinae
Butterflies of Indonesia
Taxa named by Lionel de Nicéville